George Michael Cassidy was an American football and basketball coach and college athletics administrator.  He served as the head football coach at Colorado Agricultural College—now known as Colorado State University—for one season, in 1910, compiling a record of 0–5.  Cassidy was also the head basketball coach at Colorado Agricultural for the 1910–11 season, tallying a mark of 5–4.  A native of Poultney, Vermont, Cassidy attended the University of Vermont and played on the football and baseball teams there.

Head coaching record

Football

References

Year of birth missing
Year of death missing
Colorado State Rams athletic directors
Colorado State Rams football coaches
Colorado State Rams men's basketball coaches
Vermont Catamounts baseball players
Vermont Catamounts football players
People from Poultney (town), Vermont
Coaches of American football from Vermont
Players of American football from Vermont
Baseball players from Vermont
Basketball coaches from Vermont